Kizhakkancherry is a gram panchayat in the Palakkad district, state of Kerala, India. It is a local government organisation that serves the villages of Kizhakkencheri-I and Kizhakkencheri-II. It was formed in the year of 1951 and is the fourth largest grama panchayath in Kerala. It covers an area of 112.56 km2 and comprises 22 wards. The boundaries are Vadakkencherry (north), Pananjeri (south), Vandazhy (east) and Kannambra (west). The village is located 37.4 km from the city of Palakkad and 34.9 km from Thrissur.

Nearest railway stations: Palakkad Junction (39.9 km), Palakkad town (34 km)

Nearest airports: Cochin International airport (78.6 km), Coimbatore (98.8 km)

Geography 
A major tributary of  the Bharathapuzha River  known as Gayathri River passes through Kizhakkanchery.

Demographics
 India census, Kizhakkencheri-I had a population of 22,400 with 11,043 males and 11,357 females.

 India census, Kizhakkencheri-II had a population of 16,988 with 8,436 males and 8,552 females.

The village has a majority of below average income groups who depend mostly on agriculture for their living. The majority of the population are Hindus, closely followed by Christians and Muslims. The cultivation of crops showed a sharp turn towards the cash crops like rubber, spices etc at the end of 19th century due to the migration in the hilly areas.

History 
It is a place which showcased the uprising of peasants for their rights during the National movement in India. The communist movements were strong in these areas which helped the poor farmers to regain their land from the feudal landlords. Still, the remains of the land revolution remains in the heart of the people, which can be correlated to the stronghold of communist party in these areas.

Places of interest

Kizhakkencherry Agraharam 

This is the street located on the banks of Mangalam puzha where the groups of Tamil Brahmins live together like Kalpathi agraharam in Palakkad. Mostly, the Tamil Brahmin population in Palakkad lives in the vicinity of river banks in groups. This is regarded as the place allocated to them by the king during their time of migration.

Sree Nedumparambath Bhagavathi temple

GHSS Kizhakkencherry 

Thiruvarayappan temple

Kattunkulakara bhagavathy temple, mampad

Nearest tourist spots

Managalam Dam

Nelliyyampathi Hills

Poothundi Dam

Palakuzhi hills

Festivals

Kizhakkencherry Ratholsavam 
It is a festival of Tamil Brahmins who resides in the Kizhakkencherry agraharam. It is the festival in which a chariot holding the idol of the deity and pulled by people through the streets of agraharas. It is common in all parts of Palakkad where Tamil Brahmins live.

Kizhakkencherry Vela 
This is the festival done to please the goddess of temple and has active participation from all the sections of the society in the area. It is accompanied with elephants, 'Vaadhyams' and fire crackers.

Kanyar Kali 
It is a ritualistic artform performed by rigorous training by artists. It is evolved during ancient times as a sort of entertainment for the local communities and act as a mode of get together for them. It extends over three nights during the month of May.

References 

Gram panchayats in Palakkad district